Ripper is the surname of:

 Eric Ripper (born 1951), Australian retired politician
 Georgie Ripper (born 1977), English children's book illustrator 
 João Guilherme Ripper (born 1959), Brazilian composer, conductor and academic
 Michael Ripper (1913–2000), English actor
 Rudolph von Ripper (1905-1960), Austrian-born American painter, illustrator and soldier
 Velcrow Ripper (born 1963), Canadian documentary filmmaker, writer and public speaker
 William Ripper (1853-1937), British mechanical engineer and academic